Velyka Berezovytsia is an urban-type settlement in the Ternopil Raion (district) of Ternopil Oblast (province) in western Ukraine. Its population is 6,503 as of the 2001 Ukrainian Census. Velyka Berezovytsia was first founded in 1474, and it acquired the status of an urban-type settlement in 1986. It hosts the administration of Velyka Berezovytsia settlement hromada, one of the hromadas of Ukraine. It has a population of

References

Ternopil Raion
Urban-type settlements in Ternopil Raion
Populated places established in the 1470s
1474 establishments